Adrana is a genus of bivalves belonging to the family Nuculanidae.

The species of this genus are found in America.

Species
The Global Biodiversity Information Facility recognizes 12 species.

Adrana aegra 
Adrana crenifera 
Adrana electa 
Adrana gloriosa 
Adrana lancea 
Adrana ludmillae 
Adrana metcalfei 
Adrana patagonica 
Adrana penascoensis 
Adrana sowerbyana 
Adrana stena 
Adrana tellinoides

References

Nuculanidae
Bivalve genera